is a Japanese rower. He competed in the men's coxed four event at the 1960 Summer Olympics.

References

1938 births
Living people
Japanese male rowers
Olympic rowers of Japan
Rowers at the 1960 Summer Olympics
Sportspeople from Osaka Prefecture